This is a list of filmmaking companies based in Scotland. The list includes both active and no longer active (defunct) companies. Active production companies are either run by themselves or as a subsidiary of another company.

Notable production companies

See also
 List of film production companies
 Media of Scotland
 Media in Glasgow

References

British film-related lists
 
Cinema of Scotland
Mass media companies of Scotland
Lists of mass media in Scotland
Production